Moghuiyeh or Moghaviyeh or Maghuiyeh or Maghueeyeh may refer to:
 Maghuiyeh-ye Sofla, Baft County
 Moghaviyeh, Bam
 Moghuiyeh, Rafsanjan